Netherlands at the UCI Track Cycling World Cup are the Dutch results at the UCI Track Cycling World Cup.

1995

1996

1997

1998

1999

2000

2001

2002

2003 

Final standings missing

2004 

Final standings missing

2004–05 

Final standings missing

2005–06

2006–07

2007–08

2008–09

2009–10

2010–11

2011–12

2012–13

2013–14

See also

  Netherlands at the UCI Track Cycling World Championships
  Netherlands at the European Track Championships

Netherlands at cycling events
UCI Track Cycling World Cup